Upper Green, Llantilio Crossenny, Monmouthshire is a farmhouse dating from the Medieval period. The original hall house was enlarged in the 17th century. In the 18th century, a substantial new farmhouse was built which incorporated the hall house as a service wing. Upper Green remains a private house and is a Grade II* listed building.

History and description
The origins of the farmhouse are medieval. The rear wing, the oldest remaining part, incorporates remnants of a cruck-frame roof of what was probably a hall house. In the 17th century, the building was expanded and refaced in stone. In the 18th a large new house was constructed in a Renaissance style and the original hall house was utilised as a service wing. An alternative suggestion is that the two buildings operated as separate living units.

The house is of three storeys, with substantial chimney stacks. It is constructed of rubble stone. The interior is "exceptionally well-preserved, and contains "fine" wooden fittings, including a staircase and wall cupboards, dating from the 18th century. Upper Green has been little studied, appearing neither in Sir Cyril Fox and Lord Raglan's Monmouthshire Houses nor in John Newman's Monmouthshire Pevsner. The house is recorded, although not described, in Peter Smith's Houses of the Welsh Countryside. Smith notes the house on one of his distribution maps as being a stone farmhouse with half-timbered outbuildings. It is a Grade II* listed building.

Notes

Sources
 

Grade II* listed buildings in Monmouthshire
Country houses in Wales
Grade II* listed houses